The Red Cross Society of Bosnia and Herzegovina (RCS BiH) is a component of the International Red Cross and Red Crescent Movement (hereinafter: Movement). It was recognized by the International Committee of the Red Cross (ICRC) on 8 May 2001 and admitted as a member to the International Federation of Red Cross and Red Crescent Societies (IFRC) on 7 November 2001.

The relevant provisions of the law and the statutes define the RCS BiH as a humanitarian organization of citizens of BiH, recognized and authorized to pursue certain humanitarian goals, tasks and public authority with regard to health education activities, social protection, tracing service and other program activities in peace time and during natural and other disasters, emergency situations, in accordance with the principles of humanity, impartiality, neutrality, independence, voluntary service, unity and universality.

RCS BiH is the only Red Cross organization which is operational throughout the entire territory of Bosnia and Herzegovina. It is composed of the Red Cross of the Federation of BiH, the Red Cross of Republika Srpska and the Red Cross of Brcko District BiH. ''

Services 
RCS BiH has modern, widely recognized and accepted programs. with its single network of Red Cross organizations and volunteers, which represent the foundation of the organization, RCS BiH, independently or in partnership with the governmental institutions or other non-governmental humanitarian organizations, has initiated and conducted a series of activities in response to the needs of the most vulnerable categories of population.
Programs:
Tracing service
International cooperation
Dissemination
Children and youth
Healthcare
Disaster preparedness and response
Mine risk education
Social activity

External links
Profile
Red Cross Society of Bosnia and Herzegovina Official Web Site

References
  International Federation of Red Cross and Red Crescent Societies page about Bosnia and Herzegovina
  The Red Cross Society of Bosnia and Herzegovina
  Allegations from page 32 of Mohammed Nechle's unclassified dossier

Bosnia and Herzegovina
2000 establishments in Bosnia and Herzegovina
Medical and health organizations based in Bosnia and Herzegovina